Forrester Island Wilderness is a  wilderness area in the U.S. state of Alaska at Forrester Island. It was designated by the United States Congress in 1970. It is part of the Gulf of Alaska unit of the Alaska Maritime National Wildlife Refuge.

The island is located off the coast of the Alaska Panhandle, near its southernmost portion, west of Dall Island, in the Prince of Wales-Hyder Census Area.

See also
List of U.S. Wilderness Areas
Wilderness Act

References

External links
Forrester Island Wilderness - Recreation.gov

Wilderness areas of Alaska
Protected areas of Prince of Wales–Hyder Census Area, Alaska
Alaska Maritime National Wildlife Refuge
Protected areas established in 1970
1970 establishments in Alaska